Southport is a small township in far south Tasmania, the most southern township in Australia (Cockle Creek is located further south, but it is not a gazetted town). The town had a population of 149 in 2021. It was settled in 1837 and grew to be the largest town south of Hobart; but a declining shipping industry slowly led to the town's shrinking population, and much of it has been destroyed by fire. Shore-based whaling took place at Southport in the 19th century.

References

See also
 
 

Localities of Huon Valley Council
Towns in Tasmania
Southern Tasmania
Whaling stations in Australia